Guillermo Dongo (born 8 March 1982) is a former Surinamese sprinter, who competed in the men's 100 m competition in the 2000 Summer Olympics. He scored a time of 11.10, not enough to advance past through his heat. His personal best of 10.5, was achieved the same year. He hails from Paramaribo.

References

Surinamese male sprinters
Athletes (track and field) at the 2000 Summer Olympics
Olympic athletes of Suriname
Sportspeople from Paramaribo
Living people
1982 births